Mittie is an unincorporated community in Allen Parish, Louisiana, United States. Mittie has a post office with ZIP code 70654.

References

Unincorporated communities in Allen Parish, Louisiana
Unincorporated communities in Louisiana